Tunisia competed at the 1992 Summer Olympics in Barcelona, Spain.

Competitors
The following is the list of number of competitors in the Games.

Athletics

Men
Track & road events

Boxing

Men

Judo

Men

Sailing

Men

Table Tennis

Weightlifting

Men

Wrestling

Men's Greco-Roman

Men's Freestyle

References

Sources
Official Olympic Reports

1992 in Tunisian sport
Nations at the 1992 Summer Olympics
1992